Shackleford is an unincorporated community in Saline County, in the U.S. state of Missouri.

History
Shackleford was laid out in 1879 when the railroad was extended to that point. A post office called Shackleford was established in 1879, and remained in operation until 1959. The community has the name of Thomas Shackleford, a railroad official.

References

Unincorporated communities in Saline County, Missouri
Unincorporated communities in Missouri